Let There Be Peace on Earth may refer to:
"Let There Be Peace on Earth" (song), a 1955 song by Jill Jackson Miller and Sy Miller
Let There Be Peace on Earth (album), a 1993 album by Vince Gill